The Entertainment Capital of the World is a nickname that has been applied to several cities, including:

 Las Vegas, because of its "broad scope of entertainment options including nightlife, shows, exhibits, museums, theme parks, pool parties, and so on."
 Los Angeles (or, more specifically, Hollywood), due to the area's radio, television, music, and filmmaking, as well as the abundance of tourist and amusement attractions in the region.
 New York City (or, more specifically, Broadway)

In a variation on the phrase, Branson, Missouri, United States, is known as the "Live Entertainment Capital of the World", owing to its array of approximately 50 theaters.

References

Economy of Los Angeles
Culture of Hollywood, Los Angeles
City nicknames